Johan Olof Widerberg (born 16 March 1974) is a Swedish actor appearing in numerous Swedish films and TV series.

Biography 
Johan Widerberg was born in Stockholm, the son of Swedish director Bo Widerberg.

He was cast as a part in Ocean's Twelve which the director Steven Soderbergh, in the final script, had to cut out. Eventually, Johan turned out as an extra in the film.

Filmography (selected) 
 The Wife (2017) 
 A Man Called Ove (2015)
 Så olika (2009)
 Ocean's Twelve (2004)
 Norrmalmstorg (2003) (TV)
 Gossip (2000)
 Under solen (1998)
 Lithivm (1998)
 Selma & Johanna - en roadmovie (1997)
 Juloratoriet (Christmas Oratorio) (1996)
 Svart, vitt, rött (1996)
 Radioskugga (1995) (Guest in TV series)
 Lust och fägring stor (All Things Fair) (1995)
 Rapport till himlen (Report to Heaven) (1994) TV mini-series
 Polismördaren (The Police Murderer) (1994)
 Ebba och Didrik (1990) (TV series)
 Ormens väg på hälleberget (The Serpent's Way) (1986)
 Mannen från Mallorca (The Man from Majorca) (1984)

References

External links 
Entry on IMDb

1974 births
Living people
Swedish male actors